The 78th Massachusetts General Court, consisting of the Massachusetts Senate and the Massachusetts House of Representatives, met in 1857 during the governorship of Henry Gardner. Charles Wentworth Upham served as president of the Senate and Charles A. Phelps served as speaker of the House.

There were 395 men in the combined house and senate, with the following occupations: "farmers and horticulturists, 77; merchants, 65; lawyers, 33; shoe manufacturers, 31; manufacturers, 29; clergymen, 13; physicians and housewrights, 12 each, 24; teachers, 10; master mariners, 9; lumber dealers and clerks, 6 each, 12; editors and shipwrights, 5 each, 10; blacksmiths, druggists and publishers, 4 each, 12; bakers, carriage makers, paper makers, sail makers, and grain dealers, 3 each, 16; cabinet makers, chair makers, clothiers, civil engineers, conveyancers, gentlemen, ship joiners, printers, tin plate workers, machinists, 2 each; 20; auctioneer, axe maker, auger and bitt maker, butcher, broker, balance maker, book-binder, book-keeper, book-seller, calico printer, dentist, engineer, forwarding agent, gilder, iron founder, hotel keeper, leather and hides, land surveyor, law student, reporter, provision dealer, manufacturer of cotton, silk and safes, real estate dealer, pianoforte maker, friction match, shuttle maker, bonnet maker, tanner, ship builder, tailor, mechanic, ship chandler, painter, 1 each, 35."

Senators

Representatives

 Thaddeus Allen

See also
 35th United States Congress
 List of Massachusetts General Courts

References

External links
 
 

Political history of Massachusetts
Massachusetts legislative sessions
massachusetts
1857 in Massachusetts